Gerard Stapleton (born 1958) is an Irish former hurler.  At club level he played with Borris–Ileigh and was also a member of the Tipperary senior hurling team. He usually lined out as a centre-back.

Career

Stapleton first played juvenile and underage levels with the Borris–Ileigh club before joining the club's senior team. He won three County Championship titles, before winning an All-Ireland Club Championship title in 1987. Stapleton first appeared on the inter-county scene with the Tipperary minor team that won the All-Ireland Minor Championship in 1976. He progressed onto the Tipperary under-21 team and won an All-Ireland Under-21 Championship title in 1979. By this stage Stapleton had already been drafted onto the Tipperary senior hurling team. He spent more than a decade with the team and won National Hurling League and Munster Championship honours.

Honours

Borris–Ileigh
All-Ireland Senior Club Hurling Championship: 1987
Munster Senior Club Hurling Championship: 1986
Tipperary Senior Hurling Championship: 1981, 1983, 1986

Tipperary
Munster Senior Hurling Championship: 1987
National Hurling League: 1978-79
All-Ireland Under-21 Hurling Championship: 1979
Munster Under-21 Hurling Championship: 1978, 1979
All-Ireland Minor Hurling Championship: 1976
Munster Minor Hurling Championship: 1976

References

External link

 Gerry Stapleton profile on Tipp GAA Archives website

1958 births
Living people
Borris-Ileigh hurlers
Tipperary inter-county hurlers